Vlasyevskaya is the name of several rural localities in Russia:
Vlasyevskaya, Verkhnetoyemsky District, Arkhangelsk Oblast, a selo in Afanasyevskoye Rural Settlement of Verkhnetoyemsky District, Arkhangelsk Oblast
Vlasyevskaya, Vinogradovsky District, Arkhangelsk Oblast, a selo in Morzhegorskoye Rural Settlement of Vinogradovsky District, Arkhangelsk Oblast